Copelatus ibrahimi is a species of diving beetle. It is part of the genus Copelatus in the subfamily Copelatinae of the family Dytiscidae. It was described by Angus & Kaschef in 2000.

References

ibrahimi
Beetles described in 2000
Endemic fauna of Egypt
Insects of Egypt